This is a complete list of the operas of the Italian composer Francesco Bianchi (1752–1810).

Bianchi had an extraordinarily varied career, working in different places, in different styles with different collaborators. Not only did he work in Italy, in Venice, Naples, Florence, Rome, Milan, Turin, Bologna, Brescia, Cremona, and Padua, but also extensively in Paris and London.

Although he wrote 41 'serious' drammi per musica (opera seria), he also composed 16 opéras comiques and 14 opere buffe, as well as one each of works designated as azione scenica, azione teatrale, drame héroïque, drame lyrique, festa teatrale, and opera giocosa.

List

Doubtful operas 
 Mitridate (1781, Genova)
 Attalo, re di Bitinia (1783, Venice)
 Demofoonte (1783, Venice)
 La caccia di Enrico IV (1784, Venice)
 Il barone a forza (1785, Rome)
 Li sposi in commedia (1785, Venice)
 Il nuovo Don Chischiotte (1788, Voltri)
 Il gatto (1789, Brescia)
 La calamità dei cuori (1789, Padua)
 Il difensore (1793–94, Vienna)
 Zenobia (1797, London)
 Telemaco (v. 1800, Cremona)
 Vonima e Mitridate (1803, Venice)

Isolated songs
Surviving play-texts suggest that Bianchi contributed isolated numbers to La premiere représentation by Pierre-Joseph Charrin, first performed at the Théâtre des Nouveaux Troubadours in Paris on 20 September 1806; and to Collin d'Harleville aux Champs-Élysées by Joseph Aude, Décour and Defrénoy, first given in Paris on 20 March 1806. He is also credited as having arranged the music, previously chosen by the author, for Les Sirènes by Jean-Baptiste-Augustin Hapdé, first performed at the Théâtre des Jeunes-Artistes on 24 January 1807.

References
Notes

Sources

"Bianchi, Francesco" by Marita P. McClymonds and Sven Hansell in Oxford Music Online, accessed 5 January 2010 
Operone list of works, accessed 12 March 2011

 
Lists of operas by composer
Lists of compositions by composer